Raouf Ben Amor (born 24 December 1947 ) is a Tunisian actor.

Filmography

Theater 
 1972 : Goha et l'Est embrouillé by Hamadi Ben Othman
 1977 : Les Héritiers
 1978 : Le Mariage et l'enquête
 2004 : Les Paroles de la nuit by Taoufik Jebali
 2008 : Le Journal d'un dinosaure by Taoufik Jebali and Rached Mannai
 Borni & Atraa by Mohamed Raja Farhat, Fadhel Jaïbi and Fadhel Jaziri
 Mohamed Ali Hammi by Mohamed Raja Farhat and Fadhel Jaïbi
 Jazia by Tahar Guiga, Samir Ayadi and Abdel Rahmane al-Abnoudi
 Ismaïl Pacha by Taoufik Jebali and Mohamed Driss

Cinema 
 1971 : And tomorrow... ? by Brahim Babaï
 1975 : The Messiah (Il Messia) by Roberto Rossellini : Judas
 1980 : C'est pas moi, c'est lui by Pierre Richard : the rebel leader
 1980 : Aziza by Abdellatif Ben Ammar : Ali
 1986 : Pirates by Roman Polanski : the merry-go-round keeper
 1988 : Frantic by Roman Polanski : Doctor Metlaoui
 1989 : La Barbare by Mireille Darc
 1990 : Halfaouine Child of the Terraces by Férid Boughedir
 1990 : Mort subite produced by Rai 2
 1991 : Sand Screens by Randa Chahal Sabag : the leader of the henchmen
 1992 : Deceptions by L.J. Munkler : the actor
 1993 : La Guerre du Golfe... et après ? by Nouri Bouzid
 1995 : La Danse du feu by Selma Baccar
 1997 : Le Policier de Tanger (Tangier Cop) by Stephen Whittaker produced by Channel 4
 1997 : Bent Familia by Nouri Bouzid : Majid
 2005 : Fleur d'oubli by Selma Baccar
 2005 : Junun by Fadhel Jaïbi
 2009 : Cinecittà by Ibrahim Letaïef
 2010 : Baydha (Tabou) by Meriem Riveill (short film)
 2011 : Black Gold by Jean-Jacques Annaud : His Majesty's Theologian
 2016 : Khousouf by Fadhel Jaziri
 2017 : Of Skin and Men by Mehdi Ben Attia : Taïeb
 2017 : El Jaida by Selma Baccar
 2017 : Tunis by Night by Elyes Baccar : Youssef Ben Younes

Television 
 1981 : Arme au bleu by Maurice Frydland (tv movie) : El Kakdar
 1989 : Les Gens : Radhi
 1990 : Quelle histoire by Hamadi Arafa (series)
 1992 : Confession de la dernière pluie (series)
 1994 : Warda (series)
 1995 : The Vacillations of Poppy Carew by James Cellan Jones (tv movie) : Mustafa
 1995–1996 : El Khottab Al Bab : Si Chedly
 2008 : Sayd Errim by Ali Mansour (series)
 2008 : Villa Jasmin by Ferid Boughedir (tv movie) : Ben Romdane dad
 2009 : Aqfas Bila Touyour by Ezzeddine Harbaoui (series)
 2013 : Layem by Khaled Barsaoui (series)
 2013 : Awled Lebled by Selim Benhafsa (series pilot)
 2014–2015 : Naouret El Hawa : Raouf Berhouma
 2016 : Warda w Kteb by Ahmed Rjeb (series)
 2017 : Flashback by Mourad Ben Cheikh (series, season 2)
 2017 : Nsibti Laaziza by Slaheddine Essid (series, season 7)
 2018 : Tej El Hadhra by Sami Fehri
 2019 : El Maestro by Lassaad Oueslati
 2020 : 27 by Yosri Bouassida
 2020 :  Galb El Dhib by Bassem Hamraoui
 2021 : El Foundou by Saoussen Jemni : Mokhtar, yahia's father
 2021 : Machair  (season 2) by Muhammet Gök : the minister (guest of honor of the last episode)

Emissions 
 2020 : 90 minutes by Hedi Zaiem : season 3 episode 2 guest
 2020 : Des/Confinés by Maya Ksouri : episode 28 guest
 2020 : Carthage Stories : episode 1 guest
 2021 : Labes by Naoufel Ouertani : episode 8 guest (part 4)

Videos 
 2013 : advertising spot for  El Hiwar El Tounsi
 2014 : advertising spot for Tunisie Telecom
 2014 : Marat by Ali Louati and Anouar Brahem
 2017 : appearance in the clip Yamma Lasmer Douni by Asma Othmani, realized by Zied Litayem
 2019 : Netfakker by Anouar Brahem

References

External links 

Tunisian male film actors
People from Tunis
1946 births
Living people
21st-century Tunisian male actors